Crystal Palace F.C.'s first official league season started in Division Two of the Southern League, which consisted mainly of other clubs' reserve sides alongside Grays United, Leyton, Southern United and St. Leonard's and was a successful one. 

The Palace opening match was against Southampton Reserves, and approximately 3,000 people paid 6d to stand or a shilling to sit. Palace led 3–0 after 30 minutes, before fading and losing 3–4. However, that was the club's only defeat in the League all season, and Crystal Palace won the championship and were promoted to the Southern League First Division. The season included a run of 17 straight victories, and a 9–1 win over Grays United at Crystal Palace. Attendances for the season were regularly between 2,000 and 3,000 although 4,000 watched the 1-1 FA Cup tie against Blackpool. Palace also secured their record victory in this season, a friendly against West Beckenham on 24 February 1906 which Palace won 17–2.

Southern Football League Second Division

FA Cup

As a brand new club Crystal Palace had to qualify for entry into the first round proper of the FA Cup. In the first qualifying round Palace were drawn at home against Clapham. The match saw Palace run out 7-0 winners, with William Watkins scoring the first ever hat-trick. The next round saw Palace overcome the 2nd Grenadier Guards and earn a draw against Chelsea in the third qualifying round.  Chelsea at the time were a big draw, fielding the famous goalkeeper, William Foulke. Sadly, Chelsea were obliged to fulfil a League fixture on the same day, and chasing promotion from the Football League Second Division, decided to concentrate on the league. They fielded a reserve side against Palace who duly ran out 7-1, with Watkins scoring another hat-trick.  The ease of this victory saw the FA change the rules to ensure clubs always fielded their strongest sides. Palace then dispatched Luton Town in the fourth and final qualifying round to ensure a place in the First Round Draw.  Here they were paired with Blackpool, and the tie was eventually settled in a second replay at neutral venue Villa Park after both teams failed to make home advantage pay.

Squad statistics

References

Bibliography

 Matthews, Tony (editor). We All Follow The Palace. Juma, 1998. 

Citations

Crystal Palace F.C. seasons
Crystal Palace F.C.